Hugo Filipe Pinto Servulo Firmino (born 22 December 1988) is a Portuguese professional footballer who plays for Armenian club FC Ararat-Armenia as a forward.

Club career
Born in Torres Vedras, Lisbon District, Firmino played lower league or amateur football until the age of 24. He then took his game to the Angolan Girabola where he remained three years, representing G.D. Interclube, C.R. Caála and Kabuscorp SCP.

Firmino returned to Portugal ahead of the 2015–16 season, signing with Clube Oriental de Lisboa. He made his debut in the LigaPro on 8 August 2015, starting and scoring in the 3–0 away win against U.D. Oliveirense.

Firmino continued to compete in the second division in the following years, with  C.F. União, Gil Vicente FC and C.D. Cova da Piedade. During his two-year spell with the latter club he appeared in 79 competitive matches, scored 14 goals and provided 23 assists. On 20 October 2018, he was one of two players on target as his team ousted Portimonense S.C. of the Primeira Liga after defeating the opposition 2–1 in the third round of the Taça de Portugal.

On 30 June 2019, Firmino joined Romanian Liga II side FC Universitatea Cluj. Days before the official announcement of the transfer, the Portuguese press wrongly announced that he had moved to CFR Cluj, their bitter rivals from Cluj-Napoca. He only lasted two months in the country, however, before leaving for G.D. Estoril Praia in the Portuguese second tier on a two-year deal after terminating his contract by mutual consent.

Firmino spent the following years in the Armenian Premier League, with FC Pyunik and FC Ararat-Armenia. While in service of the former, he won the national championship and was voted Player of the Season.

Honours
Pyunik
Armenian Premier League: 2021–22

Individual
Armenian Premier League Player of the Season: 2021–22

References

External links

1988 births
Living people
People from Torres Vedras
Portuguese footballers
Footballers from Lisbon
Association football forwards
Liga Portugal 2 players
Segunda Divisão players
S.C.U. Torreense players
Odivelas F.C. players
Clube Oriental de Lisboa players
C.F. União players
Gil Vicente F.C. players
C.D. Cova da Piedade players
G.D. Estoril Praia players
Girabola players
G.D. Interclube players
C.R. Caála players
Kabuscorp S.C.P. players
Liga II players
FC Universitatea Cluj players
Cypriot First Division players
Doxa Katokopias FC players
Armenian Premier League players
FC Pyunik players
FC Ararat-Armenia players
Portuguese expatriate footballers
Expatriate footballers in Angola
Expatriate footballers in Romania
Expatriate footballers in Cyprus
Expatriate footballers in Armenia
Portuguese expatriate sportspeople in Angola
Portuguese expatriate sportspeople in Romania
Portuguese expatriate sportspeople in Cyprus
Portuguese expatriate sportspeople in Armenia